Osowa is a neighborhood (in the past village suburb) of Gdańsk, Poland,  located about  north-west from the center of the city. Mainly filled with family houses, Osowa Lake with sandy beaches and a water sport center is also found there.

The Circle Highway of Tricity goes through Osowa, with an exit there and the shopping mall Osowa Center. There are bus connections to Oliwa and other quarters of the city.

Population in 2004 was 9,840 inhabitants in an area of 13.6 km2 (population density 734 inhabitants/km2) - population migration increase 2000–03 +22%.

Districts of Gdańsk